Alexander Blake was a Member of Parliament for Peterborough in 1654–5, 1656–8, and 1658–9.

References

Year of birth missing
Year of death missing
English MPs 1654–1655
English MPs 1656–1658
English MPs 1659